Krüzen may refer to: 

Hendrie Krüzen (born 1964), Dutch footballer 
Krüzen, Schleswig-Holstein, a municipality in the district of Lauenburg, Schleswig-Holstein, Germany